Greek National Road 13 (abbreviated as EO13) is a single carriageway road in northern Greece. It connects Katerini with the Greek National Road 3 at Mikro Eleftherochori, 8 km north of Elassona.

Route
The road passes through the following places:
Katerini
Moschochori
Kato Milia
Kallithea Elassonos

References

13
Roads in Central Macedonia
Roads in Thessaly